Pom Oliver (full name Rosamund Cherry Jane Oliver) is a British polar explorer and former film producer, born in May 1952.

When she was 18 years old she began travelling, eventually settling in Australia for twelve years where she started working in the film and TV industry. She became a film producer in 1977  and worked on the films Cathy's Child (1979) and Hoodwink (1981), before returning to Britain where she worked on Biggles (1986).

In 1997 she was part of the relay team which reached the North Pole, and in 1999-2000 part of the M&G Polar Team, making her one of the five who became the first British all-women's team to ski to the South Pole.

Following her polar expedition she set up the outdoor education Woodland Skills in Shadow Woods near Billingshurst in West Sussex.

References

British polar explorers
Living people
Explorers of Antarctica
Explorers of the Arctic
Female polar explorers
Year of birth missing (living people)
People from Billingshurst